Neurofibromatosis type 3 (also known as "Neurofibromatosis mixed type") resembles von Recklinghausen's disease, but also presents with cutaneous neurofibromas.

See also
Neurofibromatosis
Skin lesion

References

External links 

Genodermatoses